The Association of periOperative Registered Nurses (AORN) represents more than 41,000 registered nurses in the United States and abroad who facilitate the management, teaching, and practice of perioperative nursing, or who are enrolled in nursing education or engaged in perioperative research. Its members also include perioperative nurses who work in related business and industry sectors.

History
The first groups of organized OR nurses were concerned with many of the same issues AORN and the profession of OR nursing face today, including standardizing OR techniques and education programs and promoting friendship among OR nurses. Between 1916 and 1949, several OR nursing groups formed in various parts of the United States, leading to the formal recognition of AORN as a national association. Major milestones in the association's history include:
 The first national conference in 1954
 The establishment of a constitution, bylaws, and national officers, the AORN Board of Directors
 The establishment of the AORN Journal in 1963
 Standards for Administrative and Clinical Practice in the Operating Room, now called Perioperative Standards and Recommended Practices, a booklet first published in 1965

AORN is also involved in efforts that advance perioperative professionals and their profession. These activities include:
 Offering educational opportunities that specifically address the perioperative setting
 Setting standards for perioperative care and demonstrating how best practices can be implemented in the day-to-day work environment
 Facilitating a community of perioperative professionals that enables sharing of best practices
 Creating awareness and celebrating the value and skills of the perioperative nurse
 Empowering perioperative registered nurses to engage in efforts to shape legislative and health policy issues
 Securing resources to enable advancements in education and research in perioperative surgical care

AORN Surgical Conference & Exposition
The AORN Surgical Conference & Exposition is the largest education and networking conference of perioperative nurse professionals in the world, and the largest surgical products trade show in the US. To date there have been a total of 62 Congresses dating back to 1954.

List of past congresses

Perioperative Nurse Week 
In 1979, the AORN approved a resolution to promote consumer education and enhance public knowledge of perioperative nurse. November 14 was designated as OR Nurse Day, later it expanded to a week. Since 1979 individual members, AORN chapters, hospitals, and other medical facilities have organized special events and utilized other forms of publicity to help educate the public about the diverse roles performed by perioperative registered nurses. In 2000, OR Nurse Week was re-named to Perioperative Nurse Week to broaden the term. It always occurs in the second week of November.

Collaboration with Mercy Ships 
At the 56th annual entered into a partnership with Mercy Ships, a leading non-profit in providing free healthcare in the third world, in an effort to boost the health care accessibility and opportunities for international collaborations.

References

External links
 

Nursing organizations in the United States
Organizations established in 1949
1949 establishments in the United States
Medical and health organizations based in Colorado
Hospital nursing